Boronia microphylla, commonly known as small-leaved boronia, is a plant in the citrus family Rutaceae and is endemic to eastern Australia. It is a shrub with pinnate leaves with small leaflets and pink, four-petalled flowers.

Description
Its youngest branches are covered with small, warty glands and scattered bristly hairs.

Flowering occurs from October to February.

Taxonomy and naming
Boronia microphylla was first formally described in 1825 by Franz Sieber and the description was published in Ludwig Reichenbach's Iconographia Botanica Exotica. The specific epithet (microphylla) is derived from the Ancient Greek words mikros meaning "little" and phyllon meaning "leaf".

Distribution and habitat
This boronia grows in heath and forest in coastal areas north from Moruya in New South Wales to near Stanthorpe in Queensland, including areas inland as far as the Great Dividing Range.

Use in horticulture
Boronias are not usually easy to grow in the garden, but this species is one of the hardiest as long as it is grown in a protected position and given adequate water. It is most easily propagated from cuttings.

Gallery

References 

microphylla
Flora of New South Wales
Flora of Queensland
Plants described in 1825
Taxa named by Ludwig Reichenbach